Narayan Yadav is an Indian politician and leader of Communist Party of India (CPI). He was former MLA represented Tarapur constituency from 1980 to 1985.

References

Communist Party of India politicians from Bihar